Rudi "Poerie" van Rooyen (born 5 January 1992) is a South African rugby union player for Lokomotiv-Penza in the Professional Rugby League in Russia. His regular position is scrum-half.

Career

Youth and Varsity Cup rugby

He scored a try in his only appearance at the senior event in a 23–20 defeat to the ' Under-18s in Welkom.

Van Rooyen was also involved at Under-19 level later in 2010, making six appearances in the 's 2010 Under-19 Provincial Championship campaign. He returned for the Under-19s for the 2011 Under-19 Provincial Championship, scoring two tries as they finished runners-up in the competition. During the same period, he also made the step up to the Under-21s, playing in three matches during the 2011 Under-21 Provincial Championship.

In 2012, Van Rooyen was named in the  side that played in the 2012 Varsity Cup tournament.

Blue Bulls

Van Rooyen made his first class debut during March 2012, coming on as a substitute in the ' 2012 Vodacom Cup clash against  in Pretoria.

Griquas

After the 2014 Vodacom Cup competition, Van Rooyen moved to Kimberley to join  on a deal until the end of 2014.

Despite that being his only involvement in the first team, Griquas announced at the start of October that Van Rooyen signed a contract extension to remain in Kimberley for the 2015 season.

References

South African rugby union players
Living people
1992 births
Rugby union players from Pretoria
Rugby union scrum-halves
Blue Bulls players
Griquas (rugby union) players
Southern Kings players
Eastern Province Elephants players
Lokomotiv Penza players